The Contemporary Glass Society (CGS) is an association of  artists, collectors, students, writers, organisations, academics, galleries, manufacturers and enthusiasts of Glass. Its aim is to support Artists working in the medium of glass and to promote the development of Glass art, both Nationally and Internationally, while forging links within the glass community.

Background

Founded in 1997, by Peter Layton of the London Glassblowing Studio, together with Colin Reid and Tessa Clegg, the Contemporary Glass Society  rose from the ashes of British Artists in Glass, an informal association of individual Glass Artists founded in 1976 by a group of artists including the glass sculptor David Reekie. Essentially an informal Craft Guild, British Artists in Glass was composed almost entirely of artists working in blown and kiln glass.  Since its demise in 1992, the representation of British Glass had been left to individual efforts. There was no overall organisation. Through discussions with other like-minded people, Peter Layton identified the need for a unified, National Society, to represent the interests of enthusiasts of glass more generally, within the national and international community. The Contemporary Glass Society was the result.  

The first conference was held at the University of Wolverhampton with over 100 attendees and a line-up of speakers including, Keith Cummings, Diana Hobson and Alison Kinnard.

Present work

In 2005 CGS became a non-profit making limited company.  

An Arts Council England funded organisation, CGS has a growing membership that now includes not simply Glass artists, but makers, collectors, students, trade and education establishments. 
CGS is run by a voluntary committee made up mostly of makers and its administrator, Pam Reekie.
It publishes a quarterly newsletter Glass Network, designed by the artist Roger Kohn and runs its own website and produces material showcasing the work of glass artists throughout the UK. The society organises a number of public activities including; international conferences and one-day symposiums as well as practical workshops covering a range of techniques, such as Glass blowing, hot glass, architectural glass,  glass engraving and glass casting and kiln work.

Current members of the Contemporary Glass Society include: Katharine Coleman, Emma Woffenden, Anna Dickinson, Fiaz Elson, Catherine Hough, David Reekie, Colin Reid and Tessa Clegg.

References

External links
 Contemporary Glass Society
 Emma Woffenden
 Anna Dickinson
 Catherine Hough
 David Reekie
  Colin Reid
 Tessa Clegg
 Katherine Coleman
 The Creative Glass Guild

Non-profit organisations based in the United Kingdom